Surfer Dude may refer to:

 Antony Garrett Lisi (born 1968), whom in late 2007 the media referred to as a "Surfer Dude"
 Surfer, Dude, a 2008 comedy film
 A male surfer